Lanao in geography may refer to:
 Lanao (province), defunct province of the Philippines from 1914 to 1959
 Lanao del Norte, present province in the Northern Mindanao region
 Lanao del Sur, present province in the Autonomous Region in Muslim Mindanao (ARMM)
 Lake Lanao, second largest lake in the Philippines

Other 
 Legislative district of Lanao, the representation of the former province before it was divided in 1959